Pappalardo is a family name of Italian origin. It may refer to:

 Adriano Pappalardo, Italian singer, actor and television personality
 Federico "Derek" Pappalardo, a character in the video game Mafia II
 Franco Pappalardo La Rosa (born 1941), Italian journalist, literary critic, and writer
 Gianfranco Pappalardo Fiumara, Italian pianist
 Neil Pappalardo, American businessman, chairman of MEDITECH
 Salvatore Pappalardo (1918–2006), Italian Roman Catholic Cardinal, Archbishop of Palermo
 Salvatore Pappalardo (archbishop) (born 1945), Italian Roman Catholic Archbishop of Siracusa
 Salvatore Pappalardo (composer), Italian composer and conductor
 Tom Pappalardo (born 1973), American graphic designer, author, illustrator, and musician
 Joe Pappalardo (born 1973), American author and magazine writer
 Joe Pappalardo (American football coach), American football coach

See also 
 4241 Pappalardo,  a main-belt asteroid
 Bonelli Erede Pappalardo,  an Italian law firm

Italian-language surnames